Asehi Ekada Vhave is a 2018 Indian Marathi language romance drama film directed by Sushrut Bhagwat. The film stars Umesh Kamat, Tejashri Pradhan, Kavita Lad, Chirag Patil and Sharvani Pillai in the lead roles. It also stars Dr. Nikhil Rajshirke, Ajit Bhure and Narayan Jadhav in supporting roles. It was released on 6 April 2018.

Synopsis 

A Love Story... a simple unconventional love story... story of operating ancestral business... A Story of ‘Siddharth’ (Umesh Kamat) and ‘Revati’ (Sharvani Pillai) fortifying their spice company to the next level...A Story of expressed and unexpressed relationship between ‘Kiran’ (Tejashri Pradhan) and ‘Kirit’ (Chirag Patil). A Story adorned of ‘Anirudha’ (Ajit Bhure) and ‘Renuka’ (Kavita Lad Medhekar) ... Story of camaraderie and reliance between ‘Tejas’ (Nikhil Rajeshirke) and ‘Siddharth’. A Story of brother – sister bond between ‘Siddharth’ and ‘Revati’.Story of Love, Commitment, Possessiveness, Possession, Companionship, Relations Film is about journey of affiliations.

Cast 
 Umesh Kamat as Siddharth Vaidya
 Tejashri Pradhan as Kiran Paranjape
 Kavita Lad as Renuka Paranjpe
 Chirag Patil as Kirit
 Sharvani Pillai as Revati Vaidya
 Ajit Bhure as Aniruddh Paranjpe
 Nikhil Rajeshirke as Tejas
 Narayan Jadhav

References

External links 
 

2018 films
Indian romantic drama films
2018 romantic drama films
2010s Marathi-language films